Garden Spot High School is located in New Holland, Lancaster County, Pennsylvania, United States. Founded in 1954, this is the only senior high school in the Eastern Lancaster County School District.  It is attached to Garden Spot Middle School, making it easy for those students to go to the high school.  It was joined together from six small schools, starting in 1947.

The vestibule of the school building's main entrance contains a functioning reconstructed pendulum mechanism taken from the former New Holland High School's clock tower prior to its demolition.

Administration
The secondary campus principal is Matthew Sanger, and the assistant principal is Stacey Hoffman.

Extra-curricular activities

Garden Spot Performing Arts
Garden Spot High School's theater program, "Garden Spot Performing Arts", was begun in 1967 by Stanley Deen (1937-2016). The high school's auditorium was named in his honor following the school's 2010-2011 major renovation.

KGSH
Garden Spot High School's television station is KGSH. This airs a morning news program that informs students and teachers of upcoming school events, weather reports, sports news, and e-news. Originally a radio station, KGSH converted to an in-house TV station in 1991. KGSH is also a class in which students learn how to use video editing software to create original or parodied graphics/openings.  The station is run by the students.  There is only one teacher present during a session, which occurs during second block.

Orchestra and concert band
The Garden Spot High School Orchestra is a symphonic orchestra. String musicians are students selected by audition with the director; wind players are selected based on their audition performance in the Garden Spot High School Concert Band. The orchestra performs a holiday concert in December and an end-of-the-year concert in May, while the Concert Band performs a concert in February. GSHS musicians routinely appear in county and district orchestra festivals.

Sports

Girls' volleyball

The girls' volleyball team have been Lancaster-Lebanon Section 2 Champions in 2006, 2007, 2008, 2010, 2012, 2013, 2015, 2016, 2018, 2019 and 2020.  They appeared as Lancaster/Lebanon League finalists in 2007, 2009, 2012, 2013, 2015, 2016, 2018 and 2020; they won the LL League Championship in 2008.  They were 2007, 2008 and 2019 PIAA District III AAA semifinalists, 2020 PIAA District III AAA finalists, 2007 PIAA AAA runners-up, 2008 PIAA AAA semifinalists and 2019 PIAA AAA semifinalists.

Boys' volleyball

The boys volleyball team have been Lancaster-Lebanon Section 2 Champions in 1998, 2000, 2014 and 2021. They appeared as Lancaster/Lebanon League semifinalists in 2014 and 2021. They were 2008 and 2014 District III AA Finalists, 2014 PIAA AA quarterfinalists and 2008 and 2021 PIAA AA semifinalists.

Boys' basketball

The basketball team won Section 2 Championships from 1999–2001.  They won a record 34 straight league games, and were ranked no lower than No. 2 each year in districts.  The teams qualified each of those years for the league, district, and state playoffs, and placed second in districts in the 2001 season.  Garden Spot boys' basketball star Todd O'Brien  went on to play division 1 basketball at Saint Joseph's University and is currently playing professionally overseas.

Boys' football

The 2008 football team reached the District 3 semi-finals. The previous team to make it past the first round was the 2004 squad.

Boys' soccer
The 2002 Lancaster Lebanon League Section 2 soccer team won 14–0, and are the only undefeated soccer team in the school's history.

The 1967 soccer team was 12–1–3, winning the League Championship, the PIAA District 3 Championship and the Inter-District 1–3 Championship (over Ridley Twp. 2–1).  There was no state tournament during this era.

School changes

Block scheduling
GSHS decided to shift to block scheduling beginning in the 2008–2009 school year.

Renovations 
GSHS underwent major renovations in 2010 and 2011. Changes were made to the science wing, family consumer science classrooms (middle and high school), art and visual arts classrooms, cafeteria, performing arts rooms (band, orchestra and chorus), auditorium, library, staircases, health room, and administration and guidance offices (middle and high school). Renovations were also made to the middle school, high school and main entrances. The middle school (the side towards Tower Road) was renovated along with the courtyards in the high school. Outdoors, new bleachers and scoreboard were added, along with a concession stand and restrooms.

References

External links

Public high schools in Pennsylvania
Schools in Lancaster County, Pennsylvania
1954 establishments in Pennsylvania
Educational institutions established in 1954
New Holland, Pennsylvania